Lieutenant Osborne John Orr  (15 July 1895 – 23 October 1918) was a Canadian World War I flying ace credited with five aerial victories.

He was posthumously awarded the Distinguished Flying Cross in the 1919 New Year Honours.

References

Canadian Virtual War Memorial https://www.veterans.gc.ca/eng/remembrance/memorials/canadian-virtual-war-memorial/detail/780062

Osborne Orr birth certificate http://search-collections.royalbcmuseum.bc.ca/Image/Genealogy/b9d33853-e752-4948-b0d0-d97131ff0347

Osborne Orr marriage Certificate http://search-collections.royalbcmuseum.bc.ca/Image/Genealogy/8ca3a851-98d3-49c4-944e-db480d53889d

Commonwealth War Graves Commission https://www.cwgc.org/find-war-dead/casualty/780062/orr,-osborne-john/

Scully, Angus. In Our Youth: The Lives, Adventures, and Sacrifices of Early Canadian Flyers.
Heritage House Publishing, 2022. Victoria and Vancouver, British Columbia.

1895 births
1918 deaths
American World War I flying aces
British World War I flying aces
Recipients of the Distinguished Flying Cross (United Kingdom)
British military personnel killed in World War I